Jaffar Hussain Meraj (born 1960) is Member of Telangana Legislative Assembly from Nampally Assembly Constituency and he was Deputy Mayor of Greater Hyderabad Municipal Corporation from 2009 to 2012.

Personal life
Born in Hyderabad, India to former MLA Ahmed Hussain who was a legislator from Seetarambagh in 1967, his sons, Minhaj Hussain and Maqsood Hussain, have both completed their MBA and take care of the family business. In 2018, his younger son Maqsood Hussain died after prolonged illness.

Political career
Jaffer Hussain was elected to the GHMC for the first time in 2009 municipal elections from Tolichowki. He has been elected as Deputy Mayor of GHMC. In General State Elections 2014, he was elected as Member of legislative assembly (MLA) of Nampally Constituency. During General State Elections 2018, Jaffer Hussain retained his seat defeating his rival Feroz Khan of the Congress party. Jaffer Hussain got 57,940 votes while Feroz Khan managed to get 48,265 votes in his favour. At the third position was the Telangana Rashtra Samithi's candidate Ch Anand Kumar Goud with 17,015 votes.

References

Telangana MLAs 2014–2018
Telangana MLAs 2018–2023
1960 births
Living people
Politicians from Hyderabad, India
All India Majlis-e-Ittehadul Muslimeen politicians